Ancylosis dryadella is a species of snout moth in the genus Ancylosis. It was described by Ragonot, in 1887, and is known from Russia and China.

References

External links
lepiforum.de

Moths described in 1887
dryadella
Moths of Asia